Ballet was an important part of the Edinburgh International Festival from its earliest days, with performances taking place at the Empire Theatre, later to be refurbished to become the Edinburgh Festival Theatre.

The first company to appear was the Sadler's Wells Ballet Company who returned many times later, together with a series of visiting companies from abroad.

List

See also
Edinburgh International Festival
Ballet at the Edinburgh International Festival: history and repertoire, 1957–1966
Ballet at the Edinburgh International Festival: history and repertoire, 1967–1976
Opera at the Edinburgh International Festival: history and repertoire, 1947–1956
Opera at the Edinburgh International Festival: history and repertoire, 1957–1966
Opera at the Edinburgh International Festival: history and repertoire, 1967–1976
Drama at the Edinburgh International Festival: history and repertoire, 1947–1956
Drama at the Edinburgh International Festival: history and repertoire, 1957–1966
Musicians at the Edinburgh International Festival, 1947 to 1956
Musicians at the Edinburgh International Festival, 1957–1966
Visual Arts at the Edinburgh International Festival, 1947–1976
World premieres at the Edinburgh International Festival

References

Edinburgh Festival
Annual events in Edinburgh
Ballet-related lists